Gulf News is a daily English language newspaper published from Dubai, United Arab Emirates. It was first launched in 1978, and is currently distributed throughout the UAE and also in other Persian Gulf Countries. Its online edition was launched in 1996. Through its owner Al Nisr Publishing, it is a subsidiary of the Al Tayer Group, which is chaired by Finance Minister Obaid Al Tayer.

History and profile
Gulf News was first launched in tabloid format on 30 September 1978 by UAE businessman Abdul Wahab Galadari; its offices were located on the Airport Road, Dubai. In November 1984, three UAE businessmen, purchased the company and formed Al Nisr Publishing. The new owners of the paper were Obaid Humaid Al Tayer, Abdullah Al Rostamani and Juma Al Majid. With the death of Abdullah Al Rostamani in 2006, his position on the board is held by a family nominee while the other directors remain.

Under new ownership, Gulf News was relaunched on 10 December 1985 and was free to the public. From February 1986, the public was charged one dirham (US 27 cents) a copy for the Gulf News package which comprised the broadsheet newspaper and a leisure supplement called Tabloid, which also contained classifieds.

After moving into new premises in 1986, Gulf News began to be distributed to other GCC countries: Bahrain from September 1987; Oman from April 1989; Saudi Arabia from March 1989; and Qatar from April 1989. It also became available in Pakistan from August 1988. In order to provide better local coverage for its readers, Gulf News opened various bureaus: the Abu Dhabi bureau was opened in 1982; Bahrain bureau in January 1988; Oman bureau in 1989; Manila bureau in August 1990; Al Ain bureau in 1994; Sharjah bureau in May 1995; and the New Delhi bureau in November 1995.

In November 1995, the width of the paper's broadsheet pages was reduced by four centimetres, to create the new international size of 38 centimetres. Al Nisr Publishing became a limited liability company (LLC) with a share capital of Dh15 million on 26 May 1997.

The first online edition of Gulf News was launched on 1 September 1996. The daily launched video news in its online edition in the second part of the 2000s, being among the first in the region.

As of 2008, Abdul Hamid Ahmad was the editor-in-chief of the paper. Regular op-ed contributors to Gulf News include: Uri Avnery, Kuldip Nayar, Faisal Alkasim, Joseph A. Kechichian, Sami Moubayed, Marwan Al Kabalan, Rakesh Mani, Linda S. Heard, Stuart Reigeluth and Wael Al Sayegh. Gulf News moved to its present headquarters on Sheikh Zayed Road in April 2000.

Gulf News changed its format to Berliner on 1 June 2012, being the first Berliner-format daily published in the Arab countries.

Sponsorship and promotion
Gulf News was the first newspaper in the region to promote the arts, music and sport through sponsorship of events. 

The Gulf News Fun Drive was started in March 1986. The 26th Fun Drive was held in December 2006 and saw 750 all-terrain vehicles with over 2,800 participants. An earlier Fun Drive was recorded in the Guinness Book of Records as being a significant first achievement. Gulf News sponsors the $2 million Dubai Golden Shaheen, a Group 1 sprint which one of the main attractions, of the Dubai World Cup horse race. Gulf News also sponsors an evening of horse racing at Nad Al Sheba, with each race being named after one of its titles.

The paper also sponsors a number of other sporting events in the UAE, as well as seminars and conferences. Principal among this latter is the Arab Strategy Forum, where leaders in politics and industry gather to discuss current events affecting the region.

Role in Orkut ban
On 3 July 2007, Gulf News revisited the issue of Orkut's "immoral activities" communities, publishing complaints from members of the public against Orkut communities like "Dubai Sex", and officially bringing the complaints to the attention of the state telecom monopoly Etisalat. The ensuing moral panic resulted in a renewed ban of the site by Etisalat by 4 July 2007.

Reception
The online edition of Gulf News was reported by Forbes Middle East in 2010 to be the most-read among the English-language online newspapers in the Middle East and North Africa (MENA) region as well as in the UAE. The paper's online version was the seventh most visited website among all online newspapers in the same ranking. Forbes Middle East named it as the third online newspaper overall in the Arab world in the period from 31 August 2011 to 31 August 2012. The newspaper has been awarded few trophies at the 2016 WAN-Ifra Asian Media Awards.

Controversy
In January 2009, Gulf News ran a column by Mohammad Abdullah Al Mutawa that claimed the Holocaust was a lie.

The article has since been removed from Gulf News website.

On 15 December 2013, Gulf News in its editorial claimed without mentioning any source that Pakistan and Afghanistan did not vote for Dubai in its bid for Expo 2020. The Foreign Office of Pakistan quickly brushed aside the allegations as baseless mentioning the facts that Pakistan was committed to bid for Turkey Izmir since Turkey approached Pakistan for its support in 2011 long before Dubai even expressed its interest to host Expo 2020. Javed Jalil Khattak, Consulate General of Pakistan in Dubai, in an open letter to Gulf News termed the editorial as "an orchestrated attempt to damage and defame the historic fraternal relations between Pakistan and the UAE", while the editorial drew an angry reaction from the Pakistani expat community in the UAE.

On 10 July 2017, Francis Matthew, former Editor and then Editor-at-Large at Gulf News, was charged with the murder of his wife allegedly with a hammer blow to her head, over finances. According to the charge, he killed her in the early morning of 4 July 2017, then went to work and held meetings as normal, after which he then returned in the evening to their villa and reported to police that thieves had broken in and assaulted her. After questioning he admitted he killed her, claiming she harangued him when a huge argument erupted over finances and debts totalling some 1 million dirhams (£200,000). Subsequently, controversy surrounding his sentencing and re-sentencing has led to media reports. In October 2018, his sentence was increased from 10 years to 15 years, with pleas from Jane Matthew's family to change the charge from physical assault to premeditated murder. But then, due to the death of Jane's father, his lawyers were allowed to appeal again, as UAE newspaper The National reported: "Jane's only surviving legal heir, her son, had previously signed a waiver dropping criminal charges against his father. This meant all private charges against him had been dropped but that public law – the right of government law against an accused – was still applicable. In UAE law, if the legal successors of a victim drop charges and waive their private rights, the court is still obliged to impose a penalty against the accused under public law – but it will be a shorter term.". While the minimum sentence for murder in the UAE is 10 years, Matthew's defence expects a reduction to two years based on public law. The case is ongoing.

References

External links

XPRESS

1978 establishments in the United Arab Emirates
Newspapers established in 1978
Daily newspapers published in the United Arab Emirates
Mass media in Dubai
English-language newspapers published in the United Arab Emirates